Major-General Berthold Wells Key,  (19 December 1895 – 26 September 1986), known as Billy Key, was a British Indian Army officer.

Early life
Born on 19 December 1895, the son of Dr J.M. Key, he was educated at Dulwich College in London and commissioned onto the Unattached List of the British Army on 1 October 1914. Two months later he transferred to the British Indian Army.

Military service

First World War
Key served with the 45th Rattray's Sikhs during the First World War, reaching the rank of captain by 1918. He was wounded in Mesopotamia in 1918 and received the Military Cross, the citation for which reads:

In 1917 he married Aileen Leslie (died 1951), daughter of Colonel E.L. Dunsterville RE, with whom he had a son and two daughters. His son was killed in action in Italy during the Second World War.

Between the wars
After the First World War Key served in Afghanistan and, with the 3/11th Battalion, Sikh Regiment on the North West Frontier. Attending the Staff College, Quetta, from 1931 to 1932, in 1935 he was promoted to lieutenant colonel and from 1936 he commanded the 2nd Battalion, 11th Sikh Regiment. In 1937 he received the Distinguished Service Order while serving in Waziristan.

Second World War
He was appointed temporary Deputy Military Secretary, India from 21 December 1939 to 17 August 1940. From 18 August 1940 to 13 January 1942 he commanded the 8th Indian Infantry Brigade in Malaya. Key's brigade were the first British troops to face the Japanese when they invaded Malaya in December 1941. When Major General David Murray-Lyon was dismissed from command of the 11th Indian Division Key replaced Brigadier Archibald Paris as commander of the division. He proved an able commander but the situation in Malaya was at this point beyond salvaging and the British-led forces surrendered at Singapore on 15 February 1942 to a numerically smaller Japanese force. Key spent the remainder of the war as a prisoner of war in Japan.

Post-war
On his release Key became aide-de-camp to King George VI followed by district commands in India. He was promoted substantive major general on 20 January 1947, with seniority 2 April 1944. He retired in January 1949, and died in Sandwich, Kent, on 26 September 1986.

References

Bibliography

External links

Imperial War Museum Interview
Generals of World War II

1895 births
1986 deaths
Indian Army personnel of World War I
Indian Army generals of World War II
Companions of the Distinguished Service Order
Companions of the Order of the Bath
Military of Singapore under British rule
People educated at Dulwich College
Recipients of the Military Cross
Graduates of the Staff College, Quetta
British Indian Army generals